Studena Gora is a small settlement southwest of Ilirska Bistrica in the Inner Carniola region of Slovenia.

Unmarked grave
Studena Gora is the site of an unmarked grave from the end of the Second World War. It contains the remains of a German soldier from the 97th Corps that fell at the beginning of May 1945.

References

External links
Studena Gora on Geopedia

Populated places in the Municipality of Ilirska Bistrica